The Imagen Awards are administered by the Imagen Foundation, an organization dedicated to "encouraging and recognizing the positive portrayals of Latinos in the entertainment industry." To be considered for an Imagen Award, a media piece or person must go through an entry process. Helen Hernandez is president of the Imagen Foundation.

History 
In 1983, Helen Hernandez met with prolific television writer and producer Norman Lear. "Lear was acutely aware of the near absence of positive portrayals of Latinos in the entertainment industry and understood the importance of positive images. The two met with leaders of the National Conference for Community and Justice, a respected non-sectarian human relations organization committed to fighting prejudice and racial tensions".

The result was the Imagen Foundation Awards competition (or Imagen Awards), established in 1985.

Past honorees include such entertainment industry professionals as Andy García, Antonio Banderas, Phil Roman, Edward James Olmos, Bill Melendez, Rita Moreno, Jennifer Lopez, Selena Gomez and Héctor Elizondo.

Categories

Television Awards
Best Primetime Television Program
Best Primetime Program: Special or Movie-of-the-Week
Best Actor/Television
Best Actress/Television
Best Supporting Actor/Television
Best Supporting Actress/Television
Best Young Actor/Television
Best Young Actress/Television
Best Children’s Programming
Best National Informational Program
Best Local Informational Program
Best On-Air Advertising
Best Variety or Reality Show

Web Awards
Best Web Series: Drama
Best Web Series: Comedy
Best Web Series: Reality or Informational

References

External links
 Imagen Foundation website

1985 establishments in the United States
American film awards
American television awards
Awards established in 1985